The Omrides, Omrids or House of Omri were a ruling dynasty of the Kingdom of Israel (Samaria) founded by King Omri. According to the Bible, the Omride rulers of Israel were Omri, Ahab, Ahaziah and Jehoram. Ahab's daughter Athaliah also became queen regnant of the Kingdom of Judah.

Five Assyrian records, some of which with known duplicates, are known to refer to either "Land of Omri" or "House of Omri". An archaeological reference to Omri and his unnamed son is found in the Mesha Stele, the only Northwest Semitic inscription known to reference this name.

Biblical account
The Bible generally portrays the Omrides unfavorably, stressing their apostasy from the religion of Yahweh in favor of Baal. It devotes little attention to Omri aside from noting his establishment of the dynasty and foundation of Israel's new capital of Samaria. In contrast, his son Ahab is the subject of an extended narrative focusing on his troubled relations with the prophets Elijah and Elisha. He is depicted as a weak personality allowing himself to be led by his strong-willed wife Jezebel of Tyre, who advocated worship of Baal and the persecution of Yahwists. Note is also made of the dynasty's diplomacy, which connected it by marriage to Tyre and Judah and brought about a rapprochement with the latter after a long series of wars. The biblical account of the later Omrides concerns the revolt of Moab, their conflict with Damascus over Ramoth-Gilead, the dynasty's extinction in Israel at the hands of Jehu, and Athaliah's usurpation of the throne of Judah upon the death of her son King Ahaziah.

List of reigning Omrides
Most modern historians follow either the older chronologies established by William F. Albright or Edwin R. Thiele, or the newer chronologies of Gershon Galil and Kenneth Kitchen, all of which appear below.

Religion
The Bible notes a conflict in the time of Ahab between Israel's traditional Yahweh cult and that of Baal, which it represents as imported from Phoenicia by Ahab's queen Jezebel and promoted by her. Biblical scholar Edward Lipiński has speculated that the biblical name "Baal" actually refers not to the Phoenician deity but to Yahweh of Samaria, with the two possibly having been equated due to Samarian Yahwism being regarded as heretical by the priests of Judah, whose traditions are reflected in the biblical account. The Bible, however, presents the conflict as internal to the Omride realm, and the primary defenders of Yahwism (Elijah and Elisha) as prophets native to that kingdom. Most evidence confirms the customary predominance of Yahwism. King Mesha of Moab, a contemporary of the later Omrides, notes in the Mesha Stele the presence of vessels devoted to Yahweh in the Israelite city of Nebo at the time he conquered it. ("And Chemosh said to me, Go take Nebo against Israel, and ... and I took it: ... and I took from it the vessels of Jehovah, and offered them before Chemosh.") Lipiński and Łukasz Toboła also note that Omride royal names (Jehoram, Ahaziah, Athaliah) tend to be theophoric and refer to Yahweh.

Historicity
Israel Finkelstein's The Bible Unearthed presents a very different picture of the Omrides, making them responsible for the great empire, magnificent palaces, wealth, and peace in Israel and Judah that the Bible credits to the much earlier kings David and Solomon. According to Finkelstein, the reason for this discrepancy is the religious bias of the Biblical authors against the Omrides for their polytheism, and in particular their support for elements of the Canaanite religion.

Finkelstein maintains that the writers of the Book of Kings may have omitted possible widespread public construction that both Omri and his son Ahab commissioned during their reigns. Finkelstein and his student Norma Franklin have identified monumental construction at Samaria, Jezreel, Megiddo, and Hazor that is similar in design and build.

Archaeological evidence

The Mesha Stele bears a Moabite inscription of about 840 BCE by Mesha, ruler of Moab, in which Mesha tells of the oppression of Moab by "Omri king of Israel" and his son after him, and boasts of his own victories over the latter.

Though the Bible claims that Jehu killed the last Omride king Jehoram and his ally King Ahaziah of Judah in a coup about 841 BCE, afterwards going on to destroy most remaining members of the House of Omri, archaeological evidence cast some doubt on this account. The author of the Tel Dan Stele (usually identified as King Hazael of Damascus (c.842–806 BCE)) appears himself to have claimed to have killed the two kings. 

In addition, the Black Obelisk of King Shalmaneser III of Assyria, usually dated to 841-840 BCE, names Jehu as a "son of Omri." (The reign of Jehu is usually given as 841–814 BCE.)

Nevertheless, the reference to "son of Omri" in the Black Obelisk in the expression "Jehu son of Omri" may be a reference to the "House of Omri", which is believed to have been the Assyrian name for the Kingdom of Israel. Assyrian kings frequently referred to Omri's successors as belonging to the "House of Omri" (Bit Hu-um-ri-a).. However, none of these later references are aimed at persons, but either to the land or the people. Only in relation to Jehu is mar Hu-um-ri-i, "son of Omri", used.

List of proposed Assyrian references to the House of Omri
The table below lists all the historical references to Omri in Assyrian records.

See also
 Baasha Dynasty
 History of Ancient Israel
 House of Gadi
 Jehu Dynasty
 Jeroboam Dynasty
 Zimri Dynasty

References

 
9th-century BCE Hebrew people
Jewish royalty
Kingdom of Israel (Samaria)
Kingdom of Judah